The 2015 European Fencing Championships were held in Montreux, Switzerland from 5 to 11 June 2015 at the Montreux Music & Convention Centre.

Schedule

Medal summary

Men's events

Women's events

Medal table

 Host

Results

Men

Foil individual

Épée individual

Sabre individual

Foil team

Épée team

Sabre team

Women

Foil individual

Épée individual

Sabre individual

Foil team

Épée team

Sabre team

References

External links
Official website

2015
European Fencing Championships
2015 European Fencing Championships
2015 European Fencing Championships